Puskus Creek is a stream in the U.S. state of Mississippi.

Puskus is a name derived from the Choctaw language meaning "baby". Variant names are "Puscoos Creek", "Puscus Creek", "Puscuss Creek", and "Puss Cuss Creek".

References

Rivers of Mississippi
Rivers of Lafayette County, Mississippi
Mississippi placenames of Native American origin